Holi (Festival Of Colour) is a 1940  Hindi/Urdu social drama film directed by A. R. Kardar. Holi was produced by Ranjit Movietone and had music composed by Khemchand Prakash with lyrics by D. N. Madhok. It had Khursheed and Motilal starring in the lead with Sitara Devi, Ishwarlal, Keshavrao Date, Dixit, Ghory and Manohar Kapoor.

With two love stories as a format, the film pits the rich against the poor, in the shape of two pairs of lovers; a poor-girl-rich-boy, and a rich-boy-poor-girl. The film showed Motilal as a villain who reforms through the love of Kokila, played by Khursheed.

Plot
The film starts with a Holi scene, with the people being drenched in colour. Sunder (Ishwarlal) is a poor man who lives with his mother and sister Kokila (Khursheed). Champa (Sitara Devi), an artist, is the daughter of a wealthy Seth (business man). Champa and Sunder meet and fall in love. Chand (Motilal), also from a rich family lusts after Kokila. Sunder is framed by the evil Chand and his father (Keshavrao Date) on a robbery charge and he is caught by the police and put in jail. While he's behind bars his sister is kidnapped by Chand, who wants to marry her. When Sunder is released from jail he is told about his sister being kidnapped. However, love for Kokila has changed Chand from the villainous character and reformed him. He is due to marry Kokila. Suraj, unaware of the change and the impending marriage, rushes in and stabs Chand. Chand is rushed to the hospital. While he's battling for his life, the court procedures begin against Sunder. Finally, Chand turns up in court aided by Champa, to prove he's alive. The film ends on a happy note, with the two pairs of lovers uniting.

Cast
 Motilal as Chand
 Khursheed as Kokila
 Ishwarlal as Sunder
 Sitara Devi as Champa
 Keshavrao Date as Mangaldas
 Dixit
 Ghory
 Lala Yakub as the Judge
 Tara Bai
 Manohar Kapoor
 Mirza Musharraf
 Bhagwandas

Reception

Baburao Patel, editor of Filmindia, in his review of Holi, called the film a "little harmless entertainment, bereft of common sense", while commending the actor Ishwarlal for doing a good job. Keshavrao Date was criticised for accepting a meaningless role. Patel stated that Motilal's talents were "wasted" in the film.

Soundtrack
The music director was Khemchand Prakash, with lyrics by D. N. Madhok. The notable songs were "Phagun Ki Rut Aayi Re" sung by Sitara Devi and Amritlal , and "Oonchi Nigahon Ke Teer"  sung by Miss Kalyani.

Songlist

References

External links
 

1940 films
1940s Hindi-language films
Films directed by A. R. Kardar
Indian black-and-white films
Indian drama films
1940 drama films
Hindi-language drama films